is the 41st single by the Japanese pop-rock band Porno Graffitti. It was released in November 5, 2014 and reached the 4th place in the Oricon Singles Chart.

Track listing

References

2014 singles
Porno Graffitti songs
SME Records singles
2014 songs